Whitsunday Transit is an Australian bus and coach operator services in the Whitsunday Region. It operates 1 service under contract to the Queensland Government under the Translink banner.

History
Whitsunday Transit for formed by Sydney bus proprietor Colin Crossley  in 1998, after he purchased Sampson's Buses from founder George Sampson and the Proserpine-based company Daly's Bus Service.

Services
Whitsunday Transit operates services from Proserpine to Shute Harbour via Airlie Beach.

It also operates a service from Proserpine station to Shute Harbour that connects with Traveltrain's Spirit of Queensland service which is not operated under the Translink banner.

Fleet
As at December 2022, the fleet composed of 40 buses and coaches. Under Sampson ownership, fleet livery was cream offset by blue and red. When Colin Crossley purchased the business, he introduced the two blue and yellow carried by his Sydney operation. In 1998, a blue waves livery was introduced. This later gave way to a predominantly white livery.

References

External links
 Paton Creative gallery
 Showbus gallery

Bus companies of Queensland
Whitsunday Region